William James Hall (January 16, 1860 – November 24, 1894) was a medical and religious missionary in Korea, primarily in the capital city of Pyongyang during the 1890s. Upon graduation from medical school, he continued working in New York and was appointed as Medical Superintendent at the Madison Street Medical Mission under the supervision of the Methodist Episcopal Church. As a result of his work with the M.E. Church in New York City, Hall met his future wife, Rosetta Sherwood, who also applied to serve in the mission alongside Hall. Both Sherwood and Hall dedicated their professional life to mission work, serving in Korea starting on October 10, 1890, for Rosetta, and December 15, 1891, for William James. During his three year stay in Korea, Hall greatly expanded the Methodist Mission, providing medical, emotional and spiritual care for Korean soldiers and Pyongyang residents during the First Sino-Japanese War. Hall was a victim of political transgressions, and ultimately died of typhus on November 24, 1894, while tending to wounded men on the banks of the Taedong River.

Early life 
Hall was born in a log cabin in Glen Buell, Ontario, Canada – a remote area between Ottawa and Toronto – on January 16, 1860.  As the eldest of five children, he blossomed and showed great leadership skills from a young age. He devoted his life to the Presbyterian Church beginning at fourteen years old, but always suffered from poor health. Concerned that his life, and its impact, would be cut short due to consumption, Hall left the Glen Buell schoolhouse to pursue an early career in carpentry at the age of seventeen.

Education 
After suffering from a severe fever due to consumption, Hall left the manual trades of carpentry to return to school and pursue academics, ultimately gaining acceptance to Athens High School in 1880. Hall received his Teaching Certificate in 1883 and entered Medical College at Queens University in Kingston, Ontario in 1885. During his time at Queens College, Hall became inspired by a presentation by his future volunteer leader, Reverend John Forman of India, and decided to pursue a missionary path. His training included attending the Dwight L. Moody Summer School in Northfield, Massachusetts. Here, Hall met George D. Dowknott, the Director of the International Medical Missionary Society, who offered training in New York City to become a medical missionary. Hall traveled to New York City in 1887, where he finished and graduated from medical school at Bellevue Hospital Medical College in 1889. Hall was appointed as Medical Superintendent at the Madison Street Medical Mission (under the province of the Methodist Episcopal Church).

Personal life 
Hall was very religious based on his Presbyterian upbringing and his personal and early call to service with the Church. Hall's work was claimed to be a "romance of grace" by J. Summer Stone who was on the Board of Managers of the Medical Mission on Madison Street.

Hall met his wife and fellow medical missionary, Rosetta Sherwood, through their work at the Madison Street Medical Mission at the Roosevelt Street Dispensary in New York City. Hall was initially placed by the Methodist Episcopal Church of Canada to the China Mission. Sherwood applied for a job through a separate missionary board in 1887 in China under Hall's supervision but was instead placed in Korea to replace another missionary in 1890. Hall then applied and was granted reassignment to Korea. The two were ultimately married when they "met in the foreign field" when Hall was placed in Korea in 1891; they took their vows of matrimony in June 1892 in Korea while serving in Asia for three years of mission work. They had one son, Sherwood Hall (born 1893), a medical missionary to Korea and India, and a daughter, Edith Margaret Hall (1895–1898) born after his death.

Service 
After receiving his initial "call" during his college years in Ontario and Northfield, MA, his official call to Korean Missionary Service came on September 19, 1891.  As noted later, Hall claimed this later summons to be both a call "from the Canadian Mission Board and from the Heavens above." Hall traveled by ship from Vancouver in November 19, 1891, for an arduous five weeks, to arrive in Seoul in December 1891. Upon arrival, he worked in Seoul for four months prior to his departure for the interior of Korea. To work in the interior, Hall was required to walk 700 miles with other missionaries to his proposed station as well as for itinerant service. In August 1892, he was posted to the Pyongyang Circuit mission. He was "the first missionary appointed to exclusive work in the interior" and he went without his spouse. Upon arriving in Pyongyang, Hall's two helpers as well as the Korean individuals who rented him his lodging and medical supplies, were thrown in jail by the Korean governor's police. The Canadian was released through discussion with the Korean Missionary Service. Through political appeasement and the provision of medical care to the Korean Governor, Hall gradually made peace with the Korean people and eventually ended the seal of the Hermit Kingdom. During his three year stay in Korea, Hall greatly expanded the Methodist Mission, provided care for Korean soldiers and Pyongyang residents during the First Sino-Japanese War. He was victim of multiple political transgressions. During his last trip on the Pyongyang circuit, Hall cared for numerous war injuries. He, however, contracted malaria and had to return to Seoul. On his return, he contracted typhus a Japanese transport while tending to wounded men on the banks of the Taedong River. He died of typhus on November 24, 1894, after arriving back in Seoul.

Legacy 
Hall never left Asia, neither returning to his homeland of Canada or his adopted United States.  His rugged spirit and intense, religious devotion for helping and healing the people of Korea kept him in his new "motherland" of only three short years.  His legacy lived on through his influential missionary wife, Rosetta, as well as the Hall Memorial Hospital, Pyongyang, Korea which was started with funds initially raised by Hall. Hall's memorial grave is in the Seoul Yanghwajin Foreign Missionary Cemetery; it is inscribed: "Pioneer Medical Missionary to Pyongyang, Korea"

References

External links

1860 births
1894 deaths
Christian medical missionaries
Methodist missionaries in Korea
Canadian Presbyterian missionaries
Presbyterian missionaries in Korea
People from Leeds and Grenville United Counties